Pachydactylus angolensis, the Angola large-scaled gecko or Angolan thicktoed gecko, is a species of lizard in the family Gekkonidae. It is found in Angola.

References

Endemic fauna of Angola
Pachydactylus
Reptiles of Angola
Reptiles described in 1944